The Stanley Football Association  was an Australian rules football competition based in the Clare Valley region of South Australia, Australia. It operated between 1915 and 1936 with breaks in 1916-17 and 1919 due to World War I.

Brief history
The Stanley Football Association was formed in 1915 and featured teams (at times) from North Clare, South Clare, Blyth, Stanley Flat, Sevenhill, Farrell Flat, Watervale, Kybunga and Snowtown. The three foundation clubs were North Clare, South Clare and Blyth, all located in the cadastral County of Stanley, a historic administrative area, centred on Clare, from which the association drew its name. The association joined the Mid North Association following the 1936 season. The three original foundation clubs now compete in the North Eastern Football League.

Awards

The premiers of the competition won the Stanley Shield. It was first awarded in 1921.

The "A. E. Fryar" medal, was awarded to the player judged (by umpire votes) the fairest and most brilliant footballer during the regular season. The award was given by Albert Fryar, a well-known philatelist and sportsman originally from Clare and first awarded in 1926.

Jack Cockburn won the Fryar Medal a record three times (1929, 1930 & 1932). He would go on to win the Magarey Medal for the fairest and most brilliant player in the South Australian National Football League (SANFL) in 1935. He was also inducted into the SANFL Hall of Fame in 2003.

See also
 List of former South Australian regional football leagues

References

Defunct Australian rules football competitions in South Australia
Mid North (South Australia)
1915 establishments in Australia
1936 disestablishments in Australia